is a Japanese footballer for Kashiwa Reysol.

Club career
After attending University of Tsukuba and winning the MVP in the Kanto University Football League, Toshima joined Albirex Niigata for 2018 season.

Club statistics
Updated to end of 2018 season.

References

External links

Profile at J. League
Profile at Albirex Niigata

1995 births
Living people
Association football people from Saitama Prefecture
Japanese footballers
J1 League players
J2 League players
Albirex Niigata players
Kashiwa Reysol players
Association football midfielders
Universiade gold medalists for Japan
Universiade medalists in football